Thunder from the East: Portrait of a Rising Asia is a 2000 book co-authored by husband and wife team Nicholas Kristof and Sheryl WuDunn. It is a nonfiction study of contemporary Asia.

References

External links
Book Review from the New York Times

2000 non-fiction books
Books about Asia
Collaborative non-fiction books